James Walter Braddock (June 7, 1905 – November 29, 1974) was an American boxer who was the world heavyweight champion from 1935 to 1937.

Fighting under the name James J. Braddock (ostensibly to follow the pattern set by two prior world boxing champions, James J. Corbett and James J. Jeffries), Braddock was known for his spoiling, counterpunching style, powerful right hand, and his iron chin. He had lost several bouts due to chronic hand injuries and was forced to work on the docks and collect social assistance to feed his family during the Great Depression. He made a comeback, and in 1935 he fought Max Baer for the world heavyweight championship and won. For this unlikely feat he was given the nickname "Cinderella Man" by Damon Runyon. Braddock was managed by Joe Gould.

Early life
Braddock was born on June 7, 1905 on West 48th Street in Manhattan's Hell's Kitchen neighborhood. He moved to North Bergen, New Jersey at an early age. He was one of seven children being raised by immigrant parents; Irish mother Elizabeth O'Tool and Anglo-Irish father Joseph Braddock.

He stated his life's early ambition was to play college football for Knute Rockne at the University of Notre Dame, though this did not come to pass, as he remarked that he had "more brawn than brains".

Career
Braddock pursued boxing, fighting as a light heavyweight. His first fight in a ring occurred on November 27, 1923. He turned pro at the age of 21.

In 1928, Braddock pulled off a major upset by knocking out highly regarded Tuffy Griffiths. The following year he earned a chance to fight for the title, but he narrowly lost to Tommy Loughran in a 15-round decision. Braddock was greatly depressed by the loss and badly fractured his right hand in several places in the process.

His next 33 fights were significantly less successful, with a  record. With his family in poverty during the Great Depression, Braddock was forced to give up boxing and work as a longshoreman. Due to frequent injuries to his right hand, Braddock compensated by using his left hand during his longshoreman work, and it gradually became stronger than his right.

Braddock felt humiliated by having to accept government relief money, but he was inspired by the Catholic Worker Movement, a Christian social justice organization founded by Dorothy Day and Peter Maurin in 1933 to help the homeless and hungry. After his boxing comeback, Braddock returned the welfare money he had received and made frequent donations to various Catholic Worker Houses, and fed homeless people by inviting them to meals with his family.

Max Baer fight
In 1934, Braddock was given a fight with the highly touted John "Corn" Griffin. Although Braddock was intended simply as a stepping stone in Griffin's career, he knocked out the "Ozark Cyclone" in the third round. Braddock then fought John Henry Lewis, a future light heavyweight champion. He won in one of the most important fights of his career. After defeating another highly regarded heavyweight contender, Art Lasky, whose nose he broke during the bout on March 22, 1935, Braddock was given a title fight against the World Heavyweight Champion, Max Baer.

Considered little more than a journeyman fighter, Braddock was hand-picked by Baer's handlers because he was seen as an easy payday for the champion, despite his recent impressive victories. Instead, on June 13, 1935, at Madison Square Garden Bowl, Braddock won the Heavyweight Championship of the World as the 10-to-1 underdog in what was called "the greatest fistic upset since the defeat of John L. Sullivan by Jim Corbett".

During the fight, a dogged Braddock took a few heavy hits from the powerful younger champion (29 years versus 26 years for Baer), but Braddock kept coming, wearing down Baer, who seemed perplexed by Braddock's ability to take a punch. In the end, the judges gave Braddock the title with a unanimous decision.

Heavyweight Champion
Braddock's first title defense was to be against German Max Schmeling on June 3, 1937, in the Madison Square Garden Bowl. However, Braddock backed out of the bout in favor of a fight with Joe Louis in Chicago. Braddock argued he would have received only a US$25,000 purse against Schmeling, compared to $250,000 against rising star Louis. There was also concern that if Schmeling won, the Nazi government would deny American fighters opportunities to fight for the title. Finally, American commentators had expressed opposition to the fight in light of the connections between Schmeling and Adolf Hitler, with whom the German fighter had been associated after his earlier victory over Louis. In his only defense of the title, Braddock lost to Louis in the 8th round by a knockout, the only one of his career.

Braddock and Louis saw each other frequently over the years, and the Brown Bomber always greeted him the same way: “Hello, champ.”
As Jeremy Schaap wrote, “[Louis] fought eight world heavyweight champions, more than any other fighter ever, but he never called anyone but Jim Braddock ‘champ.’”

Personal life

Braddock married Mae Fox in 1930, and the couple had three children, James (Jay) Jr., Howard and Rosemarie.

Braddock enlisted in the U.S. Army in 1942 and became a first lieutenant. He served in the Pacific theater on the island of Saipan, where he trained enlisted men in hand-to-hand combat.

Upon return, he worked as a marine equipment surplus supplier and helped construct the Verrazano Bridge in the early 1960s.

Braddock was a member of the Fairview Teeko Club, New Jersey, where he was regarded as one of the strongest teekoists.

Death and legacy

After his death in 1974 at the age of 69, James J. Braddock was interred in the Mount Carmel Cemetery in Tenafly, New Jersey. He was inducted into the International Boxing Hall of Fame in 2001. James J. Braddock North Hudson County Park in North Bergen, New Jersey is named in his honor.

The 2005 biographical film Cinderella Man tells Braddock's story. Directed by Ron Howard, it stars Russell Crowe as Braddock and Renée Zellweger as his wife, Mae. The film had an estimated budget of $88 million and grossed $108.5 million worldwide. Crowe's performance earned him a Golden Globe nomination for Best Actor. Paul Giamatti, playing Braddock's manager Joe Gould, was nominated for the Academy Award for Best Supporting Actor. The role of neighbor Sara Wilson was played by Rosemarie DeWitt, who is Braddock's real-life  granddaughter. The film received mostly positive reviews.

Professional boxing record
All information in this section is derived from BoxRec, unless otherwise stated.

Official record

All newspaper decisions are officially regarded as “no decision” bouts and are not counted in the win/loss/draw column.

Unofficial record

Record with the inclusion of newspaper decisions in the win/loss/draw column.

 W

See also
List of heavyweight boxing champions
Boyle's Thirty Acres
Joe Louis Arena (located in Detroit, Michigan)

Notes

References
 Joe Louis, Edna Rust, Art Rust Jr., Joe Louis: My Life
 "Cinderella Man" by Eminem, 2010
 Joe Louis, 66, Heavyweight King Who Reigned 12 Years, Is Dead, Obituary, New York Times, April 13, 1981.
 Louis' TAX issues
 Jenny Nolan, "The Brown Bomber – The Man Behind The Fist", The Detroit News
 "Remembering Joe Louis", WTVM
 "The Long Loneliness", by Dorothy Day, 1952

External links
 
 James J. Braddock – CBZ Profile
 Boxing Hall of Fame
 ESPN.com
 Official James J. Braddock website (includes videos of some rounds of Braddock's fights with Baer and Louis)
 Braddock's career record – from the Official James J. Braddock website
 
 Collection of critical opinion of Cinderella Man at Rotten Tomatoes
 James Braddock vs Max Baer, 13 June 1935, all rounds
 James Braddock vs Joe Louis, 22 June 1937, all rounds
 Quits Docks To Win Three Great Fights: Half Starved, Braddock Battles His Way To Scrap With Baer, by Harry Grayson, Sports Editor, NEA Service, June 5, 1935

1905 births
1974 deaths
American male boxers
United States Army personnel of World War II
American people of English descent
American people of Irish descent
Boxers from New York (state)
Burials in New Jersey
Heavyweight boxers
Light-heavyweight boxers
Military personnel from New York City
People from Hell's Kitchen, Manhattan
People from North Bergen, New Jersey
People from West New York, New Jersey
World Boxing Association champions
World heavyweight boxing champions
Catholics from New York (state)
Catholics from New Jersey
United States Army officers
Military personnel from New Jersey